Expres (also transliterated Ekspres or Express) is a Ukrainian language Lviv-based, daily broadsheet newspaper founded in 1992. It claims to be the biggest newspaper in Ukraine in Ukrainian in terms of circulation. Its popularity is based in Western Ukraine.

According to Ekspres employees and IFEX, Ekspres has been subjected to intimidation by the Judicial system of Ukraine and the Ukrainian police in the period between 2010 and 2013. In February 2012 the International Press Institute "condemned alleged attempts by local officials to gag Ekspres". The Ministry of Revenues and Duties denied such allegations in August 2013.

The newspapers editorial office was shot at three times in 2009.

References

External links
Ekspres online 

Daily newspapers published in Ukraine
Publications established in 1992
Ukrainian-language newspapers
Ukrainian news websites
Mass media in Lviv
1992 establishments in Ukraine
Free Media Awards winners